Holiday (released in the United Kingdom as Free to Live) is a 1938 American romantic comedy film directed by George Cukor, a remake of the 1930 film of the same name. The film tells of a man who has risen from humble beginnings only to be torn between his free-thinking lifestyle and the tradition of his wealthy fiancée's family. The film, adapted by Donald Ogden Stewart and Sidney Buchman from the 1928 play of the same name by Philip Barry, stars Katharine Hepburn and Cary Grant and features Doris Nolan, Lew Ayres, and Edward Everett Horton. Horton reprised his role as Professor Nick Potter from the 1930 version.

Although Hepburn had been Hope Williams' understudy in the original production of the play on Broadway, she only played the part for one performance. Screenwriter Donald Ogden Stewart appeared in the original stage version as Nick Potter.

Plot
Jonathan "Johnny" Case (Cary Grant), a self-made man who has worked all his life, is about to marry Julia Seton (Doris Nolan), whom he met while on holiday in Lake Placid, New York. He knows very little about his bride-to-be, and is surprised to learn that she is from an extremely wealthy family, the younger daughter of banker Edward Seton (Henry Kolker).

Then Johnny meets Julia's vivacious elder sister, Linda (Katharine Hepburn), to whom he confides his plan to take a long holiday from work to find the meaning of life. He also meets the sisters' younger brother, Ned Jr (Lew Ayres), an alcoholic whose spirit has been broken by subservience to their father. At first Julia's father is stunned when she tells him her plan to marry Johnny, but is appeased after meeting Johnny and looking into his work history. Edward Sr. plans an elaborate New Year's Eve engagement party, even though Julia had promised Linda that she, Linda, could throw a smaller party for Johnny and herself, one that would include only close friends.

On New Year's Eve, upset that she did not get to throw the engagement party she was promised, Linda refuses to come downstairs. Julia sends Johnny to get her, and he finds her and Ned in "the playroom", the one truly human room in the enormous and over-built Park Avenue mansion. They are with Johnny's off-beat friends, Professor Nick Potter (Edward Everett Horton) and his wife Susan (Jean Dixon), who had gotten lost in the house and serendipitously ended up there. The group spends a joyful time together, and Julia and Edward Sr. find them just as Johnny and Linda are completing a tumbling trick.

Mr. Seton later offers Johnny a job at his bank, and Johnny reveals his plans for a holiday from work. Julia is appalled that her boyfriend had said no to her father. After seeing in the New Year with Linda, and the announcement of the engagement to the assembled guests, Johnny tries to kiss Linda. She kindly rebuffs Johnny, reminding him that she will soon be his sister-in-law. Johnny leaves the mansion in a dark mood without saying goodbye to the family, although wishing the kitchen staff a Happy New Year as he goes. Linda tells her brother that she has fallen in love with Johnny but, because of her love for her younger sister, she will keep her feelings to herself.

Hoping to patch things up between Johnny and Julia, Linda visits the Potters, and finds them packing for a voyage to Europe. They tell her that Johnny is planning to go as well, and that he has asked Julia to go with them. A telegram arrives, informing them that Julia has turned him down. Linda returns home, hoping to change her sister's mind, but they argue instead. Julia is certain that Johnny will give up his plans and return to her. Just then Johnny arrives with a compromise: He will work at the bank for two years, but will quit then if he is unhappy.

Mr. Seton accepts this, and Julia and he begin planning the couple's honeymoon in minute detail, mixing together stops at the homes of relatives with business-related matter. They discuss hiring servants to work in Julia and Johnny's new home, which he also just finds out about. This makes Johnny realize that Julia and Edward Sr.'s plan won't work, that marrying Julia on these terms will be more of an encumbrance on his freedom than he can abide. He begs Julia to marry him that evening, and travel to Europe with him. She says no. He leaves to meet the Potters and sail.

Linda sees from Julia's reaction that she is relieved by Johnny's decision. Linda makes Julia admit that she does not really love Johnny after all. With the way now clear, and inspired by Johnny, Linda renounces her father's stifling influence and declares her independence. She asks Ned to go with her, and when he can't, she promises to come back for him. Linda rushes off to meet Johnny and the Potters to go on holiday.

Meanwhile, the Potters arrive at the ship, saddened that Johnny had decided to take the job at the bank. Johnny surprises them, and explains that he couldn't go through with it, and they cheerfully celebrate. Johnny is doing a back flip in the ship's hallway when Linda arrives. Seeing her while in mid-handspring, Johnny falls on his stomach rather than finishing. As she greets the three of them Johnny takes her hand, pulls her to the floor, and they kiss.

Cast

Jean Dixon retired from films after this performance.

Production
In 1936, Columbia Pictures purchased a group of scripts, including the script for Holiday, from RKO for $80,000. Although the film was originally intended to reunite The Awful Truth co-stars Cary Grant and Irene Dunne, George Cukor decided to cast Hepburn instead, and Columbia borrowed her from RKO, where she had just turned down the lead role in Mother Carey's Chickens. Joan Bennett and Ginger Rogers were considered to play Hepburn's role, and Rita Hayworth was tested for the role of Julia.

The character of Linda Seton, played by Hepburn, was loosely based on socialite Gertrude Sanford Legendre. Donald Ogden Stewart, who co-wrote the screenplay, had played Professor Nick Potter in the original Broadway cast. Katharine Hepburn had understudied the role of Linda Seton in the original Broadway cast. The working titles for the film were Unconventional Linda and Vacation Bound.

A scene that was to come before what is now the first scene of the film was set in the snows of Lake Placid, New York, but it was filmed in Bishop, California. The idea was to "open up" the stage play by utilizing an exterior scene, but when director George Cukor saw the scene, he did not like it and decided to cut it. A few still photographs, one of them on a lobby card that was distributed to theaters, are the only known remnants of this scene.

Reception
Holiday holds a 100% rating on Rotten Tomatoes, based on 23 professional reviews. Although both The Hollywood Reporter and Variety predicted the film would have great box office appeal, Holiday was not a financial success. It was well received by critics who praised the "modernizing" of the screenplay into an implied "contest between a young New Dealer and an Old Reactionary." The Hollywood Reporter went so far as to say it should "take its place in the parade of periodic hits, along with It Happened One Night, Mr. Deeds, and The Awful Truth."

Hepburn biographers have speculated that Johnny Case's plans to give up working did not appeal to Great Depression audiences who were struggling to find jobs. Hepburn, at the time, had earned a reputation as box office poison, causing her departure from RKO Pictures, but critics claimed the Holiday marked her comeback: "If she [Hepburn] is slipping, as Independent Theatre Owners claim, then her 'Linda' should prove that she can come back--and has."

Holiday was the third of four films starring Grant and Hepburn, the others being Sylvia Scarlett (1935), Bringing Up Baby (1938), and The Philadelphia Story (1940).

Time Out London referred to Holiday as "one of Cukor's best films".

Awards and honors
The film was nominated for an Academy Award for Best Art Direction by Stephen Goosson and Lionel Banks.

Adaptations
Holiday was presented on radio on Screen Guild Theater on November 13, 1944.

Home video release
This film has been released on Blu-ray as part of the Criterion Collection, spine #1009.

References

Bibliography

External links
 
 
 
 
 
 Holiday: Play Mates – an essay by Dana Stevens at The Criterion Collection

1938 films
1938 romantic comedy films
1930s American films
1930s English-language films
1930s screwball comedy films
American black-and-white films
American films based on plays
American romantic comedy films
American screwball comedy films
Columbia Pictures films
Films about sisters
Films about social class
Films directed by George Cukor
Films set around New Year
Films set in country houses
Films set in New York City
Films with screenplays by Donald Ogden Stewart
Films with screenplays by Sidney Buchman
Love stories
Remakes of American films